Baie Norvégienne is a small bay to the south east of the Péninsule Courbet, a vast peninsula constituting the north east quarter of the Kerguelen Islands in the Indian Ocean.

The southern part of bay is the northern coast of Prince de Galles Peninsula, a short, south-east extensionof Cap Suzanne. The western part digs as for it the Eastern coast of the peninsula which slips by towards Cap Ratmanoff, more in north.

In Baie Norvégienne, there is a small tidal island named Matley Island. It is the site of the grave of John Matley, who died on Kerguelen on 12 December 1810. He was the captain of the British sealing ship Duke of Portland. Duke of Portland, Captain James Clarke Spence, visited the island again in 1811–1812. Spence brought with him a gravestone, which Matley's widow had had made, and placed it on Matley's grave.

Citations and references
Citations

References
Headland, R.K. (1989) Chronological List of Antarctic Expeditions and Related Historical Events. (Cambridge University Press).  

Landforms of the Kerguelen Islands
Norvegienne